Prashan Wickramasinghe (born 20 July 1992) is a Sri Lankan cricketer. He made his first-class debut for Sri Lanka Ports Authority Cricket Club in the 2011–12 Premier Trophy on 20 January 2012.

References

External links
 

1992 births
Living people
Sri Lankan cricketers
Ragama Cricket Club cricketers
Sri Lanka Ports Authority Cricket Club cricketers
Cricketers from Colombo